Church of Saint Pancras may refer to:

Italy
 San Pancrazio, a basilica in Rome
 San Pancrazio (Florence), a deconsecrated church
 San Pancrazio (Genoa)
 San Pancrazio, Sestino

United Kingdom
 St Pancras Old Church, a 4th-century church in St Pancras, London
 St Pancras New Church, a 19th-century church built nearby when the above fell into disrepair
 St Pancras, Soper Lane, in the City of London, destroyed in the Great Fire of 1666
 St Pancras Church, Exeter, in Devon
 St Pancras Church, Ipswich, in Suffolk
 St Pancras Church, Kingston near Lewes, in East Sussex
 Church of Saint Pancras, Widecombe-in-the-Moor, in Devon
 Church of St. Agnes and St. Pancras, Toxteth Park, in Liverpool, Lancashire
 Lewes Priory, in Sussex

Uruguay
 Inmaculado Corazón de María (San Pancracio), Montevideo

See also
 San Pancrazio (disambiguation)
 St. Pancras (disambiguation)